The Variable Energy Cyclotron Centre (VECC) is a research and development unit of the Department of Atomic Energy. The VECC is located in Kolkata, India and performs research in basic and applied nuclear sciences and development of the latest nuclear particle accelerators. It has a collaboration with the European Organization for Nuclear Research.
The Centre houses a 224 cm cyclotron—the first of its kind in India—which has been operational since 16 June 1977.   It provides proton, deuteron, alpha particle and heavy ion beams of various energies to other institutions.

The Centre consists of major facilities such as K130 Cyclotron, K500 Superconducting Cyclotron, Cyclone-30 Medical Cyclotron, Radioactive Ion Beam (RIB) Facility, Computing Centre, Regional Radiation Medicine Centre and a new Campus for the proposed ANURIB project at New Town, Rajarhat. The ANURIB (Advanced National facility for Unstable & Rare-Isotope Beams) is a planned facility, to be constructed in collaboration with the Canada-based research institute TRIUMF. ANURIB is going to conduct experiments of unstable & rare isotope beams.

References

External links 
 

Atomic Energy Commission of India
1977 establishments in West Bengal
Nuclear research institutes
Atomic and nuclear energy research in India
Physics institutes
Research institutes in West Bengal
Homi Bhabha National Institute
Government agencies established in 1977
Government agencies for energy (India)
Research institutes in Kolkata
Research institutes established in 1977